The SIAM Journal on Computing is a scientific journal focusing on the mathematical and formal aspects of computer science. It is published by the Society for Industrial and Applied Mathematics (SIAM).

Although its official ISO abbreviation is SIAM J. Comput., its publisher and contributors frequently use the shorter abbreviation SICOMP.

SICOMP typically hosts the special issues of the IEEE Annual Symposium on Foundations of Computer Science (FOCS) and the Annual ACM Symposium on Theory of Computing (STOC), where about 15% of papers published in FOCS and STOC each year are invited to these special issues. For example, Volume 48 contains 11 out of 85 papers published in FOCS 2016.

References

External links
SIAM Journal on Computing
bibliographic information on DBLP

Computer science journals
Publications established in 1972
Computing
Bimonthly journals